Wellington—Halton Hills is a federal electoral district in Ontario, Canada, that has been represented in the House of Commons of Canada since 2004.

The Member of Parliament for Wellington—Halton Hills is Michael Chong of the Conservative Party of Canada.

The riding was created in 2003 from parts of Dufferin—Peel—Wellington—Grey, Guelph—Wellington, Halton and Waterloo—Wellington ridings.

It consists of the Town of Halton Hills in the Regional Municipality of Halton and the townships of Centre Wellington, Guelph/Eramosa and Puslinch and the Town of Erin in Wellington County.  Although it is counted as part of Midwestern Ontario, it spills into Halton, which is part of the Greater Toronto Area.

This riding lost fractions of territory to Guelph and Kitchener—Conestoga during the 2012 electoral redistribution.

Members of Parliament

Election results

See also
 List of Canadian federal electoral districts
 Past Canadian electoral districts

References

Riding history from the Library of Parliament
 2011 results from Elections Canada
 Campaign expense data from Elections Canada

Notes

Ontario federal electoral districts
Centre Wellington
Halton Hills